Scythris staudingeri is a moth of the family Scythrididae. It was described by Eberhard Jäckh in 1978. It is found in Portugal and Spain.

References

staudingeri
Moths described in 1978
Moths of Europe